Georgy Semyonovich Gotua (1871 - 13 January 1936) was a Russian military officer.

Biography
Gotua was born on  1871, in Guria. In 1902 he served in the 256th Gunibsky reserve battalion, then in the 8th Krasnovodsk reserve battalion. Gotua served in the Russo-Japanese War.

In 1909 Gotua served as a captain of an infantry reserve brigade, and participated in World War I. 

In the rank of captain of the 8th Turkestan Rifle Regiment, he was awarded the Cross of St. George. As part of the Russian Expeditionary Force in France, he fought in the territories of France and Germany. In 1916 he fought in France and, with the rank of lieutenant colonel, commanded a battalion of the 2nd special regiment of the 1st brigade (later colonel of the Special Brigade in France). Gotua commanded the Russian Legion. This unit, as part of the French Moroccan Division was the first of the allied armies to breach the Hindenburg Line.

After the October Revolution, Gotua was in the Volunteer Army (later Armed Forces of South Russia, first with the 2nd army reserve battalion in the beginning of 1919 and then as a Major General in command of the 7th Reserve Battalion from 3 November 1919. In 1921 he went into exile in Yugoslavia, living with the Don Cadet Corps (Russia) in Bileća.

Gotua died on 13 January 1936. He was buried in the Belgrade New Cemetery, the resting place of many Russian emigrants.

Georgy had a son, Georgy Georgievich Gotua, who died in 1971 in Yugoslavia, and was buried with his father. Due to the impossibility of family reunification, the remaining children (Elena, Nina, Tamara and Konstantin) lived with their mother Elena in Georgia.

Awards and Honors

 Cross of St. George (18 March 1915)
 Order of Saint Vladimir, 4th class (19 December 1915)
 Order of Saint Stanislaus, 2nd class (2 September 1916)
 Order of Saint Anna, 2nd class (12 November 1916)
 Legion of Honour
 Croix de Guerre

External Links
 Готуа Георгий Семёнович
 Евгения Готуа — Поезд на Мариуполь
 Малиновский Р. Я. Солдаты России. — М.: Воениздат, 1988. — 455 с. — ISBN 5-203-00102-2
 Иван Добра. Белые тени.
 Валерии Яковлев Виват Франция! Прощаи Париж .
 Cockfield, Jamie H. With Snow on Their Boots: The Tragic Odyssey of the Russian Expeditionary Force in France During World War I. ISBN 0-312-17356-3
  Poitevin,Pierre, «La Mutinerie de la Courtine. Les regiments russes revoltes en 1917 au centre de la France», Payot Ed., Paris, 1938

References

1871 births
1936 deaths
Chevaliers of the Légion d'honneur
Recipients of the Croix de Guerre 1914–1918 (France)
Recipients of the Order of St. Anna, 2nd class
Recipients of the Order of Saint Stanislaus (Russian), 2nd class
Recipients of the Order of St. Vladimir, 4th class
White movement generals
White Russian emigrants to Yugoslavia
Russian military personnel of the Russo-Japanese War
Russian military personnel of World War I
Burials at Belgrade New Cemetery